Plesiomorpha vulpecula is a moth of the family Geometridae first described by William Warren in 1898. It is found in the Khasi Hills of India.

References

Baptini
Moths described in 1898